Masterpiece is the debut studio album by the American band Big Thief, released through Saddle Creek Records on May 27, 2016.

Recording 
Masterpiece was recorded from July 1–July 12, 2015, on Lake Champlain in Essex, New York.

Cover artwork
The album's cover features a photograph of Lenker's mother as a child, playing with a toy dinosaur.

Critical reception

Masterpiece received positive reviews upon its release. At Metacritic, which assigns a normalized rating out of 100 to reviews from music critics, the album has received an average score of 79, indicating "generally favorable reviews", based on 14 reviews.

Track listing

Personnel
Credits adapted from the album's liner notes.

 Adrianne Lenker – guitar, vocals
 Buck Meek – lead guitar, vocals
 Max Oleartchik – bass
 Jason Burger – drums
 Andrew Sarlo – production, mixing, inner panel photos
 James Krivchenia – engineering, additional production
 Sarah Register – mastering
 Jadon Ulrich – album design
 Matteo Spaccarelli – "I like a truck"

References

Saddle Creek Records albums
2016 debut albums
Big Thief albums
Country albums by American artists
Lo-fi music albums